Cymindis arizonensis is a species of ground beetle in the subfamily Harpalinae. It was described by Schaeffer in 1910.

References

arizonensis
Beetles described in 1910